Statistics of Swiss Super League in the 1975–76 season.

Overview
The Swiss Football Association was reforming the Swiss football league system this year, reducing the number of teams in the Nationalliga A from 14 to 12 and increasing the Nationalliga B teams from 14 to 16. Therefore, three teams were being relegated and only one promoted. These 14 teams were the top 12 teams from the previous 1974–75 season and the two newly promoted teams Biel-Bienne and La Chaux-de-Fonds. The champions would qualify for the 1975–76 European Cup. Reigning champions Zürich ran away with the title, they won the championship with 44 points, five points clear of second placed Servette and ten points clear of third placed Basel. The second and third placed teams were to have qualified for UEFA Cup, but because Zürich won the double the cup runners-up Servette advanced to the 1976–77 Cup Winners' Cup and the third and forth placed teams advanced tp the 1975–76 UEFA Cup. Lugano and the two newly promoted teams, Biel-Bienne and La Chaux-de-Fonds, suffered relegation.

League standings

Results

References

Sources 
 Switzerland 1975–76 at RSSSF

Swiss Football League seasons
Swiss
1975–76 in Swiss football